BAP Ferré (DM-74) was a  destroyer in service with the Peruvian Navy from 1973 to 2007. She was built by Yarrow Shipbuilders and completed for the Royal Navy in 1953 as HMS Decoy (D106).

Construction
Decoy was one of six Daring-class destroyers ordered on 16 February 1945, which followed on from 10 ships ordered earlier. Eight of the 16 Darings were cancelled in December 1945, before they were laid down, but construction of the remaining eight ships continued, while three more were built by Australia.

Decoy was laid down at Yarrow & Company's Scotstoun shipyard on 22 September 1946, was launched on 29 March 1949 and completed on 28 April 1953.

Design
The ship was of part-welded construction (some of the Darings were fully welded, but Yarrow did not have facilities to build fully welded ships), and Aluminium was used for internal bulkheads, in one of the first uses of this material in Royal Navy ships.

The ship was armed with three twin QF 4.5-inch (113 mm) Mark VI dual purpose gun mounts, with a close-in anti-aircraft armament of three twin Bofors 40 mm mounts, with two stabilised STAAG mounts and one simpler, non-stabilised Mark V (or "Utility") mount. Two quintuple mounts for 21-inch (533 mm) torpedoes were carried, while anti-submarine armament consisted of a Squid anti-submarine mortar with 30 charges.  thick splinter armour was provided for the bridge, gun turrets and turret rings, while  plating protected cable runs.

Royal Navy service

Within weeks of being first commissioned Decoy took part in the Fleet Review at Spithead to celebrate the Coronation of Queen Elizabeth II in 1953. In September 1954, Diana, along with the other three AC-powered Darings, was deployed to the Mediterranean Fleet. In 1956 she formed part of the Royal Navy's force used during the Suez Operation. On 4 September 1957, she was run aground at Portland Harbour, Dorset, due to failure of her steering gear. Later that month, Decoy returned to the Mediterranean as part of the 5th Destroyer Squadron, remaining there until July 1958.

From 1960 to 1962 the destroyer undertook trials for the Royal Navy's new Sea Cat missile system, being fitted with a single quadruple launcher on the port rear side, which was removed at the end of the trials.

By 1966 she was in reserve and completed a long refit in Portsmouth Dockyard and recommissioned again on 15 August 1967 for a general service commission, which included the West Indies and the Far East.  Before sailing she attended Portsmouth Navy Days in that year. In 1968 she escorted a Hong Kong-flagged ship to Gibraltar at the ship's Master's request after unrest.

Commanding officers (Royal Navy) 
Notable commanding officers include Captain Peter Hill-Norton (1956-1957) and Commander J J Black (1967-1969).

Peruvian Navy service

After being decommissioned she was sold to Peru in 1969 together with her sister ship . She was renamed after Diego Ferré, a war hero who died at the Battle of Angamos during the War of the Pacific.

Prior to entering service with the Peruvian Navy she underwent a major refit by Cammell Laird at Birkenhead between 1970 and 1973. Work done during this refit included the following:
 Rebuilding of the foremast for installation of the Plessey AWS-1 air-search radar 
 Installation of eight Exocet MM-38 SSMs in place of the Close Range Blind Fire Director forward of X turret

After the rebuild was done, Ferré was commissioned into the Peruvian Navy in April 1973. Further work was done on the ship by SIMA dockyards in Callao as follows:
 In 1975–76 the Squid ASW  mortar was removed and a helicopter landing deck fitted
 In 1977–1978 two OTO Melara Twin 40L70 DARDO compact gun mountings were installed as was the AESN NA-10 gun fire-control system and an AESN RTN-10X fire-control radar

Ferré tested her Exocet system against BAP Villar (ex-) after Villar had been decommissioned from Peruvian service.

After serving in two navies for 54 years, Ferré was decommissioned on 13 July 2007.

Notes

References

Sources
 

 

 

Maritime incidents in 1957
Daring-class destroyers (1949) of the Peruvian Navy
Ships built on the River Clyde
1949 ships
Daring-class destroyers (1949) of the Royal Navy